John Pierce Campbell Jr. (December 8, 1820 – October 29, 1888) was a U.S. Representative from Kentucky.

Born near Hopkinsville, Kentucky, Campbell pursued an academic course.
He studied law.
He was admitted to the bar in 1841 and commenced practice in Lexington, Missouri.
He served as member of the Missouri House of Representatives 1848-1852.
He returned to Hopkinsville, Kentucky, and engaged in agricultural pursuits.

Campbell was elected as a candidate of the American Party to the Thirty-fourth Congress (March 4, 1855 – March 3, 1857).
He declined to be a candidate for reelection.
He served as president of the Henderson & Nashville Railroad in 1870.
Organized the Mastodon Coal & Iron Co., which was succeeded by the St. Bernard Coal Co.
Devoted the latter years of his life to his large landed estates.
He died in Hopkinsville, Kentucky, October 29, 1888.
He was interred in Riverside Cemetery.

References

1820 births
1888 deaths
People from Christian County, Kentucky
Kentucky Know Nothings
Know-Nothing members of the United States House of Representatives from Kentucky
Members of the Missouri House of Representatives
19th-century American politicians
Members of the United States House of Representatives from Kentucky